Verkhneye Beryozovo is a rural locality (a selo) in Shebekinsky District, Belgorod Oblast, Russia. The population was 648 as of 2010. There are 12 streets.

Geography 
Verkhneye Beryozovo is located 52 km northeast of Shebekino (the district's administrative centre) by road. Titovka is the nearest rural locality.

References 

Rural localities in Shebekinsky District